Bayview is an unincorporated community and census-designated place (CDP) in Beaufort County, North Carolina, United States. As of the 2010 census, it had a population of 346.

The community is located on the north bank of the Pamlico River, south of North Carolina Highway 92.

Demographics

References

Census-designated places in Beaufort County, North Carolina
Census-designated places in North Carolina
Populated places on the Pamlico River
Unincorporated communities in Beaufort County, North Carolina
Unincorporated communities in North Carolina